Highway 923 is a provincial highway in the Canadian province of Saskatchewan. It runs from Highway 922 to a dead end near Listen Lake.

See also 
Roads in Saskatchewan
Transportation in Saskatchewan

References 

923